The Men Who Built America: Frontiersmen is a six-hour, four-part miniseries docudrama which premiered on March 7, 2018 on the History Channel. It is a complement to the 2012 docudrama The Men Who Built America. The series follows the lives of Daniel Boone, Lewis and Clark, Davy Crockett, Andrew Jackson, and others who blazed new trails across America's wilderness. The series is narrated by Campbell Scott, directed by John Ealer and executive produced by Leonardo DiCaprio.

Cast

Main
Jonathan C. Stewart as Daniel Boone
Gareth Reeves as Davy Crockett
Derek Charition as Meriwether Lewis 
Joseph Carlson as William Clark
Robert I. Mesa as Tecumseh
Nathan Stevens as Kit Carson
Adam Jonas Segaller as John C. Frémont
David Stevens as Andrew Jackson

Guest
Madeleine Adams as Jemima Boone
Mo Brings Plenty as Blackfish
Phil Peleton as Judge John Henderson
Simba Matshe as Pompey
Andrew Robert as William Henry Harrison
William Strongheart as Tenskwatawa "The Prophet"
Melissa Kramer as Sacagawea
Adam Gardiner as Thomas Jefferson
John Bach as James Madison
Cohen Holloway as General John Coffee
John Wraight as William Fitzgerald
Barry Mawer as General Henry Proctor
Matt Cleaver as Sam Houston
Paul Yates as John Alexander Forbes
Arlo MacDiramid as James K. Polk
Jed Brophy as Stephen Kearny

Episodes
Note: The series consists of eight one-hour episodes; for TV they were combined into four two-hour episodes.

References

External links

2018 American television series debuts
History (American TV channel) original programming
2018 American television series endings
2010s American documentary television series
English-language television shows